The Woman Chaser is a 1999 film directed by Robinson Devor and starring Patrick Warburton, Ron Morgan, Emily Newman, Paul Malevich, and Marilyn Rising. The screenplay is based on the novel of the same name by Charles Willeford.

Synopsis 
Set in 1950s Los Angeles, Richard Hudson (Warburton) is a shrewd car dealer who moves from San Francisco and sets up a used-car dealership. Tiring of this job, he turns the lot over to an assistant Bill (Ron Morgan) and starts writing his first film, The Man Who Got Away. It turns out to be an uncommercial picture, chronicling the story of a truck driver who goes berserk, runs over a little girl and dies fending off a platoon of police officers.

In making his film, Richard enlists the help of his father-in-law, Leo (Paul Malevich), a washed-up former film director whose notable possession is a Rouault painting of a clown. Through Leo, Richard pitches his idea to the Man (Ernie Vincent), the chief executive of Mammoth Pictures who green-lights the project. Conflict inevitably arises when Richard's obsession for making the movie his way clashes with the Man. Other kooky characters include Richard's mother (Lynette Bennett), a former ballerina who lures her hirsute lug of a son into a comically eccentric pas de deux ; Richard's sexually curious stepsister, Becky (Marilyn Rising), who seduces him, and his secretary, Laura (Emily Newman), whom he impregnates with a boorish indifference.

Cast 
 Patrick Warburton as Richard Hudson
 Eugene Roche  as Used Car Dealer
 Ron Morgan as Bill
 Emily Newman as Laura
 Paul Malevich as Leo
 Lynette Bennett as Mother
 Joe Durrenberger as Chet
 Ernie Vincent as The Man
 Josh Hammond as Young Richard.

Release 
The Woman Chaser premiered at the 1999 New York Film Festival and went on to play at top film festivals including Sundance, South By South West, Florida, Seattle, Stockholm and Athens winning several special jury and audience awards.

On Jun 14, 2000, it was released in theater. The film had theatrical distribution in major U.S. cities and played on Sundance Channel and Showtime, becoming a cult movie.

In 2015 a redux version of the film was released with half the music replaced by original score written by Hollywood film and television composer, Jeff McDonough. All the music in the film is now original, half being written by original composer Daniele Luppi, and half written and scored by Jeff McDonough. This is the updated version available on all film streaming services.

Awards 
SXSW FILM FESTIVAL 2000 
- Winner, Audience Award Narrative Feature - First Film: Robinson Devor

FLORIDA FILM FESTIVAL 2000

- Winner, Special Jury Award Robinson Devor: For the best narrative feature.

- Nominee, Grand Jury Award Best Narrative Feature: Robinson Devor

SUNDANCE FILM FESTIVAL 2000 
- Nominee, American Spectrum

GOLDEN TRAILER AWARDS 2001 
- Nominee, Golden Trailer Best Comedy: Tarmac Films

References

External links

Los Angeles Times
Film Threat
LA Weekly
IndieWire
Sundance Film Festival

1999 films
1990s black comedy films
1999 independent films
American black comedy films
American independent films
Films about filmmaking
Films about writers
Films based on American novels
Films set in Los Angeles
Films set in the 1950s
1990s parody films
Films about car dealerships
American parody films
1990s English-language films
1990s American films